Hsu Yung-ming (born 15 May 1966) is a Taiwanese political scientist, pollster, and politician. He represented the New Power Party within the Legislative Yuan from 2016 to 2020. In August 2019, he began serving as NPP chairman. Following his removal from the post in August 2020, Hsu withdrew from the party.

Academic career
Hsu earned his doctoral degree in political science from the University of Michigan in 1999 before beginning his teaching career at National Chung Cheng University. In the mid-2000s, Hsu was a political analyst and research fellow at Academia Sinica's Research Center for Humanities and Social Sciences. He later joined the faculty of Soochow University, where he taught political science, and served as director of the Taiwan Brain Trust think tank. After completing his term on the Legislative Yuan and stepping away from party politics, Hsu returned to his teaching position at Soochow.

Political stances as an academic
Citing survey data from the Mainlander Taiwanese Association, Hsu opined in 2005 that differing views of the 228 Incident are no longer an ethnic issue, but instead a cross-party conflict. He has criticized the Kuomintang and People First Party's electoral strategy in the 2000 presidential elections, comparing it to the Democratic Party's loss in the United States presidential elections held that same year. Shortly after the 2006 protests led by Shih Ming-teh, Hsu wrote that the proposed formation of a third presidential ticket in the 2008 election would have taken more votes from the Democratic Progressive Party, leading to an easy Kuomintang victory. The KMT won that election without the materialization of a third-party candidate.

Hsu believes that increased economic cooperation between Taiwan and China is a manifestation of dependency theory.

Political career
Hsu joined the New Power Party on 21 June 2015, after failing to secure a legislative nomination in the Taichung area from the Democratic Progressive Party. Hsu was named a deputy leader of the NPP on 13 September 2015, and stepped down from that position in March 2016. He served the party within the Legislative Yuan as its first caucus whip.

Legislative actions
Despite Kuomintang opposition, Hsu and the New Power Party moved to abolish the Red Cross Society Act of the Republic of China in July 2016.

New Power Party chairmanship and legal judgements
On 21 August 2019, Hsu was elected chairman of the New Power Party by a 7–5 vote of its executive council. He was removed from the post on 1 August 2020, following allegations of bribery. Hsu withdrew from the New Power Party four days later. The Taipei District Court ruled in July 2022 that Hsu had violated the Anti-Corruption Act, and sentenced him to seven years and four months imprisonment.

Personal life
Hsu has a son from a previous marriage even though they divorced later.

References

1966 births
Living people
Party List Members of the Legislative Yuan
New Power Party Members of the Legislative Yuan
Politicians of the Republic of China on Taiwan from Taichung
Pollsters
Taiwanese political scientists
Academic staff of Soochow University (Taiwan)
University of Michigan alumni
Academic staff of the National Chung Cheng University
New Power Party chairpersons
Taiwanese politicians convicted of corruption